Beta phase may refer to:
 the second phase in a software release life cycle:  see Software release life cycle#Beta
 the second phase of pharmacokinetics:  see Pharmacokinetics#Stages of Pharmacokinetic Processes